Confession  is a 2022 South Korean mystery thriller film directed by Yoon Jong-seok, starring So Ji-sub, Kim Yunjin, Nana and Hwang Sun-hee. Based on Oriol Paulo's 2016 Spanish film The Invisible Guest, the film depicts a story about a man who has been pointed out as the culprit of a locked-room murder and his lawyer approaching the truth. 

The film had its premiere at 36th Fribourg International Film Festival on March 20, 2022, and its Italian premium at 24th Udine Far East Film Festival on April 30, 2022 as closing film of the festival. It was released theatrically in South Korea on October 26, 2022.

Synopsis
Min-ho's mistress is found dead in a hotel, whose only residents are the couple. He becomes the prime suspect, but insists he is innocent and hires a crack defence attorney. Min-ho is convinced that a car accident is linked to the murder. (Fribourg International Film Festival)

Cast
 So Ji-sub as Yoo Min-ho
 Kim Yunjin as Yang Shin-ae
 Nana as Kim Se-hee
 Hwang Sun-hee
 Choi Kwang-il as Han Young-seok
 Hong Seo-joon as Jang Tae-soo 
 Han Gap-soo as Han Seon-jae
 Park Mi-hyun as a hotel receptionist

Production
In September 2019, it was announced that So Ji-sub will return to films with the film Confession, and Kim Yunjin was cast to play the female lead. In November 2019, Nana was cast in the film. Principal photography began on December 16, 2019 and the film was wrapped up on February 29, 2020.

Release
Confession had its premiere at 36th Fribourg International Film Festival on March 20, 2022 In April 2022, it was invited to 42nd Fantasporto - Oporto International Film Festival in competition section, where it won Best Director Award. It was also selected as the closing film at the 24th Udine Far East Film Festival held from April 24 to April 30, 2022. In July 2022, it was invited at the 21st New York Asian Film Festival, where it was screened at Lila Acheson Wallace Auditorium, Asia Society on July 23 for its North American premiere. It was also invited to the 26th Fantasia International Film Festival and screened for its Canadian premiere on July 31, 2022. 

The film was invited at the 40th Brussels International Fantastic Film Festival and was screened for Belgian premiere on September 1, 2022.

The film was released theatrically on October 26, 2022 in South Korea.

Home media
The film was made available for streaming on IPTV (KT olleh TV, SK Btv, LG U+ TV), Home Choice, Google Play, Apple TV, TVING, WAVVE, Naver TV, KT skylife, and Coupang Play from December 6, 2022.

Reception
Teresa Vena of Asian Movie Pulse appreciated the direction, cinematography and performance and wrote, "Thanks to its great actors not only in the two main roles, “Confession” is more than a simple crime movie. It also fascinates with its intelligent structure. Only the ending leaves one a little bit unsatisfied."

Accolades

References

External links
 
 
 
 

2022 films
2022 thriller films
Lotte Entertainment films
2020s South Korean films
2020s Korean-language films
South Korean mystery thriller films
South Korean remakes of Spanish films